Iron Chef Canada is a show on Food Network Canada which premiered 10 October 2018. The show is hosted by Gail Simmons, with Chris Nuttall-Smith as the floor reporter, and Jai West as The Chairman. The show is produced by Corus Entertainment and based on the popular Iron Chef franchise.

Besides the secret ingredient that has to be featured in every dish, the Chairman also introduces a "culinary curveball" in the middle of the competition that has to be used in at least one dish.

The chefs compete in the sponsored "Monogram Kitchen Stadium".

Development 
On 30 May 2019, Corus Entertainment renewed Iron Chef Canada for a second season. On the Food Network Canada website, the new episodes are still counted towards first season.

Iron Chefs

Episodes

Season 1

Season 2

Season 3

References

External links 
 

Canada
Food Network (Canadian TV channel) original programming
2018 Canadian television series debuts
2010s Canadian cooking television series
2010s Canadian reality television series
2020s Canadian reality television series
Cooking competitions in Canada
Non-Japanese television series based on Japanese television series
Canadian television series based on non-Canadian television series